Farm Animal Rights Movement (FARM) is an international nonprofit organization working to promote a vegan lifestyle and animal rights through public education and grass roots outreach. It operates ten national and international programs from its headquarters in Bethesda, Maryland.

FARM has the abolitionist vision of a world where animals are free from all forms of human exploitation, including, food and clothing, research and testing, entertainment and hunting. FARM's mission is to spare the largest number of animals from being bred, abused, and slaughtered for food, as this accounts for 98% of all animal abuse and slaughter.

FARM was co-founded by Dr. Alex Hershaft in 1976 as the Vegetarian Information Service to distribute information on the benefits of a vegetarian diet. In 1981, it became the Farm Animal Reform Movement by embracing veganism and the right of animals not to be used for food. In 2011, it adopted the DBA of Farm Animal Rights Movement to emphasize its commitment to ending the use of animals for food, rather than merely reforming their treatment.

History

In August 1975, Dr. Alex Hershaft became involved in the vegetarian movement after attending the World Vegetarian Congress in Orono, ME, and meeting Jay Dinshah.

In 1976, Hershaft founded the Vegetarian Information Service (VIS) to distribute information on the benefits of a vegetarian diet. That same year, he participated in the hearings before the Senate Select Committee on Nutrition and Human Needs, which led to the publication of Dietary Goals for the United States, and eventually to the periodic publication of the Dietary Guidelines for Americans. Subsequently, VIS testified before Congress in favor of the 1978 National Consumer Nutrition Information Act and the Federal Meat Inspection Act of 1978.

Accordingly, in the summer of 1981, Hershaft organized Action For Life, a national conference in Allentown, Pennsylvania, that effectively launched the U.S. animal rights movement. Participants included such animal rights pioneers as Cleveland Amory, Ingrid Newkirk, Alex Pacheco, Peter Singer, Henry Spira, Gretchen Wyler, as well as radio host Thom Hartmann. These conferences continued for seven more years in San Francisco (1982), Montclair, NJ (1983), Los Angeles (1985), Chicago (1986), Cambridge, Massachusetts (1987), and Washington (1984 and 1991).

Immediately following the 1981 conference, Hershaft co-founded the Farm Animal Rights Movement (FARM) to promote a vegan lifestyle and animal rights. FARM's early programs were Gentle Thanksgiving (1976), Action for  Life conferences (1981–1991), Compassion Campaign (1982–1992), Veal Ban Campaign (1982–1986), World Farm Animals Day (1983), Great American Meatout (1985), Letters from FARM (1996), the second series of annual national animal rights conferences (1997), Consumers for Healthy Options in Children's Education (CHOICE) (1999–2009), Sabina Fund (1999), and Vegan Earth Day (2001).

As of 2020, Eric C. Lindstrom is the executive director of FARM.

World Day for Farmed Animals
World Day for Farmed Animals (WDFA) was launched in 1983 (as World Farm Animals Day) to expose the abuses of animal farming and to memorialize the billions of cows, pigs, and other innocent, sentient animals slaughtered for food throughout the world. The date selected was October 2, the birthday of Mahatma Gandhi, world's foremost advocate of nonviolence.

The occasion is observed each year with slaughterhouse protests and other dramatic events by hundreds of activists in the U.S. and two dozen other countries.

World Day for Farmed Animals has been covered in the media including The Washington Post, Delaware Online, and New York Daily News.

Great American MeatOut
Playing off the "Great American Smokeout", the Great American MeatOut was launched in 1985 to protest a U.S. Senate resolution proclaiming National Meat Week. It has since grown into one of the world's largest annual grass roots diet education campaigns. The date of March 20 marks the first day of spring, symbolizing renewal and life-changing opportunity.

The occasion is observed each year by hundreds of activists in the U.S. and two dozen other countries with food samplings, leafleting, information tables, and other educational events. Visitors are asked to pledge that they will kick the meat habit on March 20 (first day of spring). Special MeatOut proclamations have been issued by 40 governors and 47 mayors of large American cities. 

In 2021, MeatOut was met with intense opposition by ranchers across the West when Colorado Governor Polis proclaimed MeatOut Day across the state. In 2022, MeatOut Day was proclaimed in: 

 Dallas, Texas
 Houston, Texas
 Charlotte, North Carolina
 Durham, North Carolina
 Columbus, Georgia
 Louisville, Kentucky
 Cincinnati, Ohio
 Madison, Wisconsin
 Riverside, California
 Fort Wayne, Indiana

And for the first time, MeatOut Day was proclaimed in New York City by Mayor Eric Adams.

The MeatOut campaign has received media coverage including Time, Huffington Post, Washington Post, and Los Angeles Times.

10 Billion Lives
FARM's 10 Billion Lives campaign pays people $1 to watch a four-minute video that begins by noting the viewer's respect for the unique personality of the family pet and the parallel with farmed animals. It continues with graphic factory farm and slaughterhouse footage and closes by empowering the viewer to change the horrors he/she just witnessed by pledging a number of vegan days per week. The video is screened at rock concerts and college campuses by a specially designed truck and mobile kiosks.

Each viewer receives a series of eight weekly introductions to veganism, then a weekly Meatout Mondays newsletter containing a recipe, product or book review, health news, and human interest story. This reflects FARM's concept of "sustained vegan advocacy", which posits that the initial contact must be followed by  weekly support to prevent regression.

Animal rights conferences
FARM's 1981 first-ever animal rights conference laid the foundation for the U.S. animal rights movement. Seven additional annual conferences followed in 1982 (San Francisco), 1983 (Montclair, NJ), 1984 (Washington, DC), 1985 (Los Angeles), 1986 (Chicago), 1987 (Cambridge, Massachusetts), and 1991 (Washington, DC). Between 1987 and 1996, the annual conferences were taken over by the National Alliance for Animals.

In 1997, FARM resumed management of the animal rights movement's annual conferences, alternating locations between Washington, DC, and Los Angeles. A typical conference involves a thousand attendees, 90 presenters from 60 organizations, a hundred sessions, 90 exhibits, and several new video documentaries.

Beginning in 2000, conference presenters have been inducting to a U.S. Animal Rights Hall of Fame national leaders, authors, or other key agents of change who have made an outstanding contribution to the advancement of animal rights in the U.S. for at least ten years.

Legacy
Aside from the specific accomplishments of its own 14 programs (including the three defunct ones), FARM has had a number of impacts on the U.S. Animal Rights Movement, in particular, and U.S. dietary and social justice advocacy, in general:

 FARM's 1981 Action for Life conference provided the springboard for formation of the U.S. animal rights movement. FARM's current annual conferences still offer the only national networking opportunity for movement leaders and activists. 
 FARM has been largely responsible for turning the U.S. animal rights movement mission from vivisection to animal farming, which accounts for 98% of all animal abuse and killing. FARM's Veal Ban Campaign and World Farm Animals Day were the first farmed animal advocacy programs in the U.S.
 FARM's 10 Billion Lives, Live Vegan, and Meatout Mondays programs have promoted vegan advocacy by recognizing that new vegans need sustained support to keep from reverting to consumption of animal products.
 FARM's Great American Meatout was a forerunner to similar annual grassroots diet education campaigns by the American Heart Association, American Cancer Society, and Center for Science in the Public Interest, as well as the 2003 revival of the Meatless Monday campaign by the Johns Hopkins Center for a Livable Future and the 2009 Meat-Free Monday campaign by Paul McCartney. 
 FARM's Congressional testimonies, participation in numerous national party platform hearing and conventions, and national polls of candidates for public office brought the concept of veganism and animal rights to key U.S. legislators, executives, and journalists.
 Equal Justice Alliance is bringing the concept of freedom of advocacy for animal rights and other social justice issues to the highest levels of U.S. legal community.

A number of animal rights movement leaders got their start at FARM, including Gene Baur, Peter Link (organizer of the 1990 March for Animal Rights), Mike Markarian (Exec. VP, The Humane Society of the United States), Jack Norris (co-founder of Vegan Outreach), Alex Pacheco, and Paul Shapiro.

Prominent supporters of FARM's campaigns have included screen and television celebrities Ed Asner, Bob Barker, James Cromwell, Doris Day, Casey Kasem, Bill Maher, Mary Tyler Moore, Alicia Silverstone, and Jane Velez Mitchell, as well as social reformers Cesar Chavez, Thom Hartmann, Michael Jacobson, Frances Moore Lappe, Heather Mills, and Jeremy Rifkin.

Animal Charity Evaluators review
Animal charity evaluator Animal Charity Evaluators has named FARM as a Standout Charity in their May 2014 and December 2014 reviews. The December 2014 review states that FARM's openness to change based on new evidence, their stable leadership and organizational structure, and their transparency are all reasons for their selection as a Standout Charity.

See also
List of animal rights groups

References

External links
 
 World Day for Farmed Animals
 Great American Meatout
 Live Vegan
 Compassionate Holidays
 Vegan Videos

1976 establishments in the United States
Animal welfare organizations based in the United States
Animal rights organizations
Organizations established in 1976